Onkivesi is a  rather large lake of Finland. It belongs to the Vuoksi main catchment area. It is located in the Northern Savonia region and mostly in Lapinlahti municipality. Water in the lake is somewhat brownish partly due to natural inflows and partly due to the location in an agricultural area.

See also
List of lakes in Finland

References

Lakes of Kuopio
Lakes of Nurmes